Sandhitha Velai is a 2000 Indian Tamil-language drama film directed by Ravichandran, his second film after Kannedhirey Thondrinal (1998). The film stars Karthik in two roles. Roja and Kausalya play the female leads, while Vijayakumar, Sujatha, Moulee, Chinni Jayanth, Vivek, Manivannan, and Nassar play supporting roles alongside an ensemble cast. The film was released on 14 April 2000 during Tamil New Year. It received mixed reviews. The Telugu film Gentleman (2016) starring Nani was loosely inspired by this film.

Plot
Aadalarasu is an unemployed youth looking for a job. He is constantly mocked for this by his father, Gurumoorthy, while his mother supports him. While in Madras for a job interview, he stays with his father's friend Sivaraman. Aadalarasu has run-ins with Sivaraman's daughter Thilaka and she develops a dislike for him. However, she bows to her father's wishes and weds Aadalarasu. Just when she starts liking him, he has to travel again for an interview. He misses the train and returns home and tells about this. His father scolds him badly and he leaves the house in depression. He boards a lorry to catch the train and the lorry stops in a railway checkpost. Adalarasu learns that the train will be two hours late and runs after the train and meets his look alike. he is Thirunaavukkarasu, who tells his flashback.In the flashback its shown that Thirunaavukkarasu is a rich person whose father runs a car factory but his son Thirunaavukkarasu is a go jolly guy who enjoys life. This leads to his sister's marriage's cancellation and his factory is shut down due to financial loss. He drinks heavily and drives the car and in an accident the car is blasted, but he is saved. Now the story comes to present and Thirunavukkarasu asks him for a favour and gets a promise and dies in the train. Now Adalarasu descends from the train and is taken to Thirunavukkarasu's house.

Cast

Karthik as Nadarajan aka Aadalarasu and Thirunaavukkarasu
Roja as Thilaka
Kausalya as Akalya
Vijayakumar as Gurumoorthy, Aadalarasu's father
Sujatha as Aadalarasu's mother
T. S. B. K. Moulee as Sivaraman, Thilaka's father
Chinni Jayanth as Jeeva
Vivek
Manivannan
Nassar
Sonu Sood as Sandeep
Thalaivasal Vijay as Vasu
Ramji
Anu Mohan
Madhan Bob
Thyagu
Pandu
Bala Singh
Thalapathy Dinesh
Lavanya
Shakti Kumar
Raju Sundaram in a special appearance

Production
The filming began in 1998 and was the second directorial work by Ravichandran. It was briefly delayed due to the selection of heroines. Isha Koppikar and then Suvalakshmi were selected for a role, but their refusal meant that Roja was signed. For another lead role, Simran was selected but due to date clashes, she too was replaced by Kausalya. There were rumours that the film was delayed because of Karthik experiencing trouble due to his health.

Soundtrack
The music was composed by Deva.

References

External links
 

2000 films
2000s Tamil-language films
Films scored by Deva (composer)
Tamil films remade in other languages